This is a list of Buddhist temples, monasteries, stupas, and pagodas in Bhutan for which there are Wikipedia articles, sorted by location.

Bumthang 
 Kurjey Lhakhang – one of Bhutan's most sacred temples – image of Guru Rinopche enshrined in rock.

Paro 
 Paro Taktsang (Tiger's Nest) – perched on a 1,200 meter cliff, this is one of Bhutan's most spectacular monasteries.
 Rinpung Dzong

Phobjika
 Gangteng Monastery

Punakha
 Punakha Dzong – constructed by Zhabdrung Ngawang Namgyal in 1637–38 it is the head monastery of the Southern Drukpa Kagyu school.

Thimphu
 Chagri Monastery

See also
 Buddhism in Bhutan
 Dratshang Lhentshog
 Architecture of Bhutan
 List of Buddhist temples

Notes

External links

 BuddhaNet's Comprehensive Directory of Buddhist Temples sorted by country
 Buddhactivity Dharma Centres database

 
 
Bhutan
Buddhist temples